Fauna of Slovakia includes:

 List of birds of Slovakia
 List of Lepidoptera of Slovakia
 List of mammals of Slovakia
 List of non-marine molluscs of Slovakia

See also
 Outline of Slovakia
 :Category:Fauna of Slovakia